The Consensus or Consensus Net, also known as 21st Century Web, was a Chinese renowned ideological and cultural website launched on 1 September 2009 by Zhou Zhixing. The website published commentaries and analysis from both left and right wing scholars on topics such as economics and culture.

Sponsored by Lide Consensus (Beijing) Network Media Technology Co., Ltd., the position of Consensus leaned toward liberalism.

Consensus (www.21ccom.net) was the official website of Leader Magazine in simplified Chinese, whose mission was to "seek consensus in the era of great transformation".

History
The 21ccom.net domain name was registered on February 20, 2009.

Consensus was shut down by order of the Beijing authority on October 1, 2016.

References 

Defunct websites
Internet censorship
Internet properties established in 2009
Internet properties disestablished in 2016